Nicola Capria (6 November 1932 – 31 January 2009) was an Italian politician, member of the Italian Socialist Party.

He was Deputy from 1976 to 1994 and served also as Minister several times from 1986 to 1992 in the governments led by Spadolini, Fanfani, Craxi and Andreotti.

He was also city councilor in Messina, Vice-president of the Sicily Region, regional deputy to the Sicilian Regional Assembly and regional secretary of the Sicilian PSI.

He resigned as parliamentary leader of the PSI when, on 12 January 1994, the prosecutor's office of the Republic of Messina notified him of a guarantee notice in the context of investigations into the Sirap affair for external competition in mafia association. From that moment, although fulfilled with a full formula, because the fact does not exist, he definitively closed all relations with the world of politics.

He died in Rome on 31 January 2009,  at the age of 79.

References

External links

1932 births
2009 deaths
People from the Province of Reggio Calabria
Italian Socialist Party politicians
Deputies of Legislature VII of Italy
Deputies of Legislature VIII of Italy
Deputies of Legislature IX of Italy
Deputies of Legislature X of Italy
Deputies of Legislature XI of Italy
Politicians of Calabria